Nizhalattam is a 1970 Indian Malayalam-language film, directed by A. Vincent and produced by Hari Pothan. The film stars Prem Nazir, Sheela, Kaviyoor Ponnamma and Thikkurissy Sukumaran Nair. The film marked the acting debut of Sudheer and Balan K. Nair.

Cast

Prem Nazir as Ravi
Sheela as Shantha
Kaviyoor Ponnamma as Ravi's Mother
Thikkurissy Sukumaran Nair as Karunakaran Muthalali
Jose Prakash as Bhaskaran
Kottayam Santha as Mrs. Nair
Pattom Sadan as Music Conductor
Sankaradi as Kumaran
Jesey
Nilambur Balan
Abbas as Security Guard
Bahadoor as Kurup
Balan K. Nair as Balan
M. Bhanumathi as Madhavi
Metilda
N. Govindankutty as Paul
Nellikode Bhaskaran as Old Man
P. R. Menon
Paravoor Bharathan
R. K. Nair
Sudheer as Dasan
Thodupuzha Radhakrishnan
Devika
Kunchan
 Kedamangalam Ali
 Mohan
 R.K Nair
 Thapi Mohammed
 Sabu

Soundtrack
The music was composed by G. Devarajan and the lyrics were written by Vayalar Ramavarma.

Box office
The film was commercial success.

References

External links
 

1970 films
1970s Malayalam-language films
Films directed by A. Vincent